Stained Glass is an American spy thriller novel by William F. Buckley, Jr., the second of eleven novels in the Blackford Oakes series.
Its first paperback edition won a 1980 National Book Award in the one-year category Mystery (paperback).

Plot
Oakes's second assignment sends him to West Germany. There, he is infiltrated into the inner-circle of a charismatic and heroic nobleman, Count Wintergrin, who intends to run for the West German Chancellorship on platform of immediate re-unification with East Germany. Although this is ultimately in the interest of the Western Powers and NATO, the threat of Soviet invasion of West Europe means that Oakes must prevent Wintergrin's election, by whatever means necessary. Set in 1953.

References
Notes

Citations

Bibliography

 
 

1978 American novels
Blackford Oakes novels
Novels set in Germany
National Book Award-winning works
Doubleday (publisher) books